A green envelope (Malay: sampul hijau or sampul duit raya) is a Malay adaptation of the Chinese red envelope custom. During the festival of Eid ul-Fitr, Muslims in Malaysia, Brunei, Singapore, and Indonesia hand out money in green envelopes to guests who visit their homes. The colour green was chosen for its association with the Islamic paradise. The idea of handing out green envelopes is based on the Islamic concept of zakat, where every Muslim is required to provide at least 2.5% of their wealth to the needy. However, Malays now hand out these green envelopes during Aidilfitri not only to their poor guests, but also to the middle class and to the upper class. The amount of money depends on how much the host can afford to give their guests.

See also 
 Eidi (gift)
 Red envelope

References

Malay culture
Giving
Envelopes
Eid (Islam)